Christopher Matthew Avalos (born November 5, 1989) is an American professional boxer who challenged for the IBF super bantamweight title in 2015 and the WBA (Super) featherweight title in 2017. At regional level he held the WBO-NABO bantamweight and super bantamweight titles in 2010 and 2013 respectively.

Professional career
On April 24, 2010 Avalos stopped the veteran John Alberto Molina to win the WBO-NABO bantamweight title.

In August 2010, Avalos lost to an undefeated Christopher Martin Peña at the Grand Casino in Hinckley, Minnesota. The bout was televised on a Showtime undercard.

In February 2015 he was defeated by IBF super bantamweight champion, Carl Frampton in Belfast, losing via fifth-round technical knockout.

In his next big fight he was defeated by WBA (Super) featherweight champion, Léo Santa Cruz, losing one his second world title attempt via eighth-round knockout.

References

External links 

Chris Avalos - Profile, News Archive & Current Rankings at Box.Live

American boxers of Mexican descent
Boxers from San Diego
Bantamweight boxers
Super-bantamweight boxers
Featherweight boxers
1989 births
Living people
American male boxers